Jahangir Alam (born 6 June 1991) is a Bangladeshi cricketer. He made his List A debut for Uttara Sporting Club in the 2018–19 Dhaka Premier Division Cricket League on 23 March 2019.

References

External links
 

1991 births
Living people
Bangladeshi cricketers
Uttara Sporting Club cricketers
People from Rajshahi District